Undercover Angel may refer to:
 Undercover Angel (film), a 1999 Canadian film
 "Undercover Angel" (song), a 1977 song by Alan O'Day

See also 
 Undercover Angels, a 2002 Australian television series
 Undercover Angels (album), an album by Grand Buffet